Leroy Estrada (born June 16, 1994) is a Panamanian professional boxer who challenged for the WBC mini-flyweight title in 2018.

Professional career
Estrada made his pro debut on September 23, 2010. Estrada was first ranked by a sanctioning body in August 2013, entering the IBF's rankings as the #15 mini-flyweight contender, with a 9-1 pro record. In May 2017, Estrada faced Saúl Juárez on a WBC title eliminator, with the winner becoming the mandatory challenger to Wanheng Menayothin. Estrada outboxed Juárez and survived a knockdown to win by unanimous decision. Estrada faced Wanheng Menayothin on May 2, 2018. He proved to be no match for the champion, who battered him and dropped him five times before knocking him out with a right uppercut in round 5. With the win, Wanheng tied Floyd Mayweather Jr.'s 50–0 record.

References

External links

1994 births
Panamanian male boxers
Living people
Mini-flyweight boxers
20th-century Panamanian people
21st-century Panamanian people